Ringwood is a rural locality in the Lockyer Valley Region, Queensland, Australia. In the  Ringwood had a population of 66 people.

Geography 
Ringwood is located on the Warrego Highway which forms its southern boundary. The southern half of the locality is about 110–130 metres above sea level and is predominantly used for crops and grazing. The northern half is more rugged rising to an unnamed peak at 340 metres at the locality's north-western edge; this land is undeveloped bushland. The locality is almost entirely freehold land.

History 
In the  Ringwood had a population of 66 people.

References

Lockyer Valley Region
Localities in Queensland